Bosnia and Herzegovina competed at the 2020 Winter Youth Olympics in Lausanne, Switzerland from 9 to 22 January 2020.

Alpine skiing

Boys

Girls

Biathlon

Boys

Cross-country skiing 

Boys

Girls

Luge

Boys

See also
Bosnia and Herzegovina at the 2020 Summer Olympics

References

2020 in Bosnia and Herzegovina sport
Nations at the 2020 Winter Youth Olympics
Bosnia and Herzegovina at the Youth Olympics